The third cabinet of Ana Brnabić was formed on 26 October 2022, following the latter's election as Prime Minister of Serbia by the National Assembly on the same day. It succeeded the second cabinet of Ana Brnabić and is the incumbent government of Serbia since 26 October 2022.

The Serbian Progressive Party (SNS) came to power in 2012. Brnabić was appointed prime minister by Aleksandar Vučić, the president of Serbia, in June 2017 and was elected shortly afterward by the National Assembly. Initially an independent politician, she joined SNS in 2019; she was re-elected after the 2020 Serbian parliamentary election. After the snap 2022 parliamentary election, Vučić gave Brnabić another mandate to form a government and stated that she would serve for two years, instead of a regular four-year mandate.

The cabinet is composed of members of SNS, Socialist Party of Serbia (SPS), Democratic Alliance of Croats in Vojvodina (DSHV), United Serbia (JS), Party of United Pensioners of Serbia (PUPS), Social Democratic Party of Serbia (SDPS), and Justice and Reconciliation Party (SPP). The Alliance of Vojvodina Hungarians (VMSZ) serves as confidence and supply for the government. With 28 ministers in total, it has the largest amount of ministers of any post-Milošević government.

Background 

The Serbian Progressive Party (SNS) came to power after the 2012 parliamentary election, along with the Socialist Party of Serbia (SPS). Ana Brnabić, an independent politician, was appointed prime minister by Aleksandar Vučić, who served as prime minister up until the April 2017 presidential electionin June 2017, and was elected prime minister by the National Assembly in the same month. Brnabić joined SNS in 2019, and was re-elected as prime minister after the 2020 parliamentary election.

SNS placed first in the snap 2022 parliamentary election, although it lost its parliamentary majority. Shortly after the election, Vučić announced that consultations regarding the formation of the government would begin. The consultations lasted between 14 and 18 July. Brnabić was given the mandate to form a new government on 27 August. Additionally, Vučić also announced that Brnabić would head the government for two years, instead of a regular four-year mandate.

Investiture 
The investiture vote occurred on 26 October 2022. The Alliance of Vojvodina Hungarians (VMSZ), although not apart of the cabinet, announced in the National Assembly that it would serve as confidence and supply for the government.

Composition 
The third cabinet of Ana Brnabić is composed of 25 ministries. It has the largest amount of ministers of any post-Milošević government.

Timeline

2022 
The National Assembly adopted the Law on Ministries on 21 October 2022, which set the basis of the incoming 25 ministries of the third cabinet of Ana Brnabić. 150 MPs voted in favour of the law. The composition of the government was revealed by Aleksandar Vučić following a meeting at the Serbian Progressive Party's (SNS) headquarters on 23 October 2022. The Belgrade Centre for Security Policy (BCSP) noted that "those who were seen as pro-Russian... were cut off" although that Zorana Mihajlović, who was seen as pro-Western, was also dismissed, with BCSP claiming that it is related to "some concessions of the conservative part of SNS"; nevertheless, BCSP claimed that the government would not abandon "continuity" regarding foreign policy. Bojan Klačar of CeSID noted that "with the entering of Tanja Miščević into the government, it is a sign that European Integrations could be more in focus than before". Brnabić stated that "the government would be not pro-Western nor pro-Russian, and it would rather fight for its national interests". The cabinet was elected and sworn-in on 26 October 2022. The government proposed the budget for year 2023 in November 2022 and the National Assembly adopted it on 9 December 2022, with 156 votes in favour.

Notes

References 

Cabinets of Serbia
2022 establishments in Serbia
Cabinets established in 2022
Current governments